Vilhelm Hammershøi, often anglicised as Vilhelm Hammershoi (15 May 186413 February 1916), was a Danish painter. He is known for his poetic, subdued portraits and interiors.

Life

Vilhelm Hammershøi was born in 1864 in Copenhagen, Denmark. The son of a merchant, Christian Hammershøi, and his wealthy wife, Frederikke (née Rentzmann), Hammershøi studied drawing from the age of eight with Niels Christian Kierkegaard and Holger Grønvold, as well as painting with Vilhelm Kyhn, before embarking on studies with Frederik Vermehren and others at the Royal Danish Academy of Fine Arts. From 1883 to 1885, he studied with Peder Severin Krøyer at the Independent Study Schools, then debuted in the Charlottenborg Spring Exhibition in 1885 with Portrait of a Young Girl (showing his sister, Anna). Pierre-Auguste Renoir is reported to have admired this painting. Hammershøi married Ida Ilsted in 1891.

Artistic career

Hammershøi worked mainly in his native city, painting portraits, architecture, and interiors. He also journeyed to the surrounding countryside and locations beyond, where he painted rolling hills, stands of trees, farm houses, and other landscapes. He is most celebrated for his interiors, many of which he painted in Copenhagen at Strandgade 30 (where he lived with his wife from 1898 to 1909, and Strandgade 25 (where they lived from 1913 to 1916). He travelled widely in Europe, finding London especially atmospheric in providing locations for his highly understated work, suffused as it was at the time with a foggy, coal smoke polluted atmosphere. His work in consequence has been described as "Monet meets the Camden School".

Hammershøi's wife figures in many of his interiors, often depicted from behind. Ida is also the model in many similar works by her brother, Peter Ilsted. Peter and Vilhelm were lifelong friends, business partners, and colleagues. The Metropolitan Museum of Art held an exhibition of their collective works in 2001, and there was an exhibition of his works in 2008 at the Royal Academy of London.

Technique

Hammershøi's paintings are best described as muted in tone. He refrained from employing bright colours (except in his very early academic works), opting always for a limited palette consisting of greys, as well as desaturated yellows, greens, and other dark hues. His tableaux of figures turned away from the viewer project an air of slight tension and mystery, while his exteriors of grand buildings in Copenhagen and in London (he painted two exteriors of the British Museum between 1905 and 1906) are devoid of people, a quality they share with his landscapes.

Critical acclaim
Hammershøi's early works, with their simplicity and recording of the "banality of everyday life", enjoyed critical acclaim. He was sought out by artists and literary figures of the time, among them Emil Nolde and Rainer Maria Rilke, who both remarked on his retiring manner and reluctance to talk. After a trip to Paris, his work became overly detailed. According to art critic Souren Melikian, his "painterly skill remained but the magic was lost."

Hammershøi's melancholic vision has now regained its place in the public consciousness. He is now one of the best-known artists in Scandinavia, and comprehensive retrospectives of his work have been organized by the Musée d'Orsay in Paris and the Guggenheim Museum in New York. In 2008, the Royal Academy of London hosted the first major exhibition in Britain of Hammershøi's work, Vilhelm Hammershøi: The Poetry of Silence. Hammershøi's only painting on constant display in Britain is 'Interior' in the National Gallery.

In 1997, Denmark issued a postage stamp in his honour.

BBC documentary
In 2005, Hammershøi's life and oeuvre was featured in a BBC television documentary, Michael Palin and the Mystery of Hammershoi, with the British comedian and writer Michael Palin. In the programme, Palin, fascinated by Hammershøi, whose pictures he conceived as having a distinct enigmatic coolness and distance about them, sets out to unlock the mysteries and find out about the background of Hammershøi. Palin, wanting to know of his inspirations and the reason for these mystical pictures, started his search in Hayward Gallery in London, goes to Amsterdam and finally to Copenhagen.

Highest auction price for Danish work

In June 2012, Hammershøi's Ida læser et brev (Ida Reading a Letter) was auctioned by Sotheby's in London for £1,721,250 or DKK 15,747,499, a record for any Danish work of art. Two other paintings by Hammershøi were also sold the same day at Sotheby's for unusually high prices: Interiør med to lys (Interior with Two Candles) was auctioned for DKK 10,110,000 and Ida i interiør (Ida in Interior) for DKK 6,120,000.

In December 2018, following Christie's New York European Art auction, The Getty Museum acquired the painting Interior with an Easel, Bredgade 25 (1912) for $5,037,500.

Exhibitions
 Vilhelm Hammershøi: The Poetry of Silence, Royal Academy, Sackler Wing of Galleries, London, UK, 28 June—7 September 2008
 Vilhelm Hammershøi: The Poetry of Silence, The National Museum of Western Art, Tokyo, Japan ( - 7 November 2008)
 Vilhelm Hammershoi’s Paintings at Scandinavia House, Scandinavia House, New York 
 Painting Tranquility: Masterworks by Vilhelm Hammershøi, Art Gallery of Ontario, Toronto, Canada, 16 April—3 July 2016

See also
 Art of Denmark
 Dust Motes Dancing in Sunbeams

References

Further reading
Vad, Poul (1992). Vilhelm Hammershøi and Danish Art at the Turn of the Century. New Haven: Yale University Press.

External links

 
 Ida Reading a Letter - information on the painting by Hammershøi which made a record price at Sotheby's
 Hammershøi: the poetry of silence (gallery) at The Guardian
 Hammershoi - World of Interiors by Michael Palin
 Hammershoi 2008 exhibition at the Royal Academy of London
 Hammershoi entry in Denmark's artist database (JavaScript)
 Hammershoi.co.uk – prints seller, but biography and image galleries
 Hammershoi - a review of Hammershoi's work triggered by an exhibition at the Art Gallery of Ontario

Danish portrait painters
Artists from Copenhagen
1864 births
1916 deaths
Burials at Vestre Cemetery, Copenhagen
19th-century Danish painters
Danish male painters
20th-century Danish painters
19th-century Danish male artists
20th-century Danish male artists